Karnataka Sahitya Academy Award is an annual literary award given to literary works in Kannada by the Karnataka Sahitya Academy. Karnataka Sahitya Academy Award is given to individual books published in various genres like poetry, novel, short fiction, criticism, travel writing, translation, children's writing etc., as well as for the complete contribution of a writer to Kannada literature. 

Instituted in 1983, it has been given to some of the most eminent writers in Kannada like P.Lankesh, U.R.Ananthamurthy, K.P.Poornachandra Tejaswi, B.T. Lalitha Naik, Niranjana, Jayanta Kaikini, K Y Narayanaswamy etc.

Awards

Annual honorary award

Sahityashree Award

Book prizes 
The following is a partial list of award winners and the name of the books for which they won.

Poetry

Novel

Short story

Play

Humour

Essay

Travelogue

Biography / Autobiography

Criticism

Children work

Science writing

Research

Translation (creative)

Translation (non-creative)

Debut work

See also
  Sahitya Akademi Award to Kannada Writers

References

External links 
 Karnataka Sahitya Academy (Book) Award winners
 Karnataka Sahitya Akademi Award winners (Total contribution)

Indian literary awards